This is a list of schools of the Roman Catholic Archdiocese of San Francisco.

High schools
Marin County
 Marin Catholic High School (Kentfield in unincorporated Marin County)
 San Domenico School (San Anselmo)

San Francisco
 Archbishop Riordan High School
 Convent of the Sacred Heart High School
 Immaculate Conception Academy
 Mercy High School (San Francisco)
 Sacred Heart Cathedral Preparatory
 St. Ignatius College Preparatory
 Stuart Hall High School

San Mateo County
 Junípero Serra High School (San Mateo)
 Mercy High School (Burlingame)
 Notre Dame High School (Belmont)
 Sacred Heart Preparatory (Atherton)
 Woodside Priory School, Portola Valley

Grade schools
Grades are PK-8 unless otherwise specified.
 Marin County
 Our Lady of Loretto School (Novato)
 Saint Anselm School (San Anselmo)
 Saint Hilary School (Tiburon)
 Saint Isabella School (San Rafael)
 Saint Patrick School (Larkspur)
 Saint Raphael School (San Rafael)

 San Francisco
 Convent of the Sacred Heart (Girls only)
 De Marillac Academy (grades 4-8)
 Ecole Notre Dame des Victoires
 Father Sauer Academy (grades 6-7)
 School of the Epiphany
 Holy Name School
 Mission Dolores Academy
 Our Lady of the Visitacion School
 Saint Anne School
 Saint Anthony-Immaculate School
 Saint Brendan School
 Saint Brigid School
 Saint Cecilia School
 Saint Finn Barr Catholic School
 Saint Gabriel School
 Saint James School
 Saint John School
 Saint Monica School
 Saint Paul School
 Saint Peter School - Mission District, San Francisco - It opened in 1878. Previously its students were Irish or Italian American, but by 2014 95% of the student body was Latino and about two thirds were categorized as economically disadvantaged. Enrollment was once around 600 but by 2014 was around 300 due to gentrification. Its yearly per-student cost was $5,800 while yearly tuition, the lowest in the archdiocese, was $3,800.
 Saint Philip School
 Saint Stephen School
 Saint Thomas More School
 Saint Thomas the Apostle School
 Saint Vincent de Paul School
 Saints Peter & Paul School
 Stuart Hall for Boys (Boys only)

 San Mateo County
 All Souls School (South San Francisco)
 Good Shepherd School (Pacifica)
 Holy Angels School (Colma)
 Immaculate Heart of Mary School (Belmont)
 Nativity School (Menlo Park)
 Notre Dame Elementary School (Belmont)
 Our Lady of Angels School (Burlingame)
 Our Lady of Mercy School (Daly City)
 Our Lady of Mount Carmel School (Redwood City)
 Our Lady of Perpetual Help School (Daly City)
 Sacred Heart Schools (Atherton)
 Saint Catherine of Siena School (Burlingame)
 Saint Charles School (San Carlos)
 Saint Dunstan School (Millbrae)
 Saint Gregory School (San Mateo)
 Saint Matthew School (San Mateo)
 Saint Pius School (Redwood City)
 Saint Raymond School (Menlo Park)
 Saint Robert School (San Bruno)
 Saint Timothy School (San Mateo)
 Saint Veronica School (South San Francisco)
 Woodside Priory Middle School (Portola Valley (grades 6-8)

References

External links
 San Francisco Archdiocese Schools

Schools in the Roman Catholic Archdiocese
San Francisco

San Francisco, Roman Catholic Diocese of
Education in San Francisco